Guillaume Turlan (born 18 October 1996) is a French rower. He competed in the 2020 Summer Olympics with his twin brother Thibaud.

References

1996 births
Living people
Sportspeople from Bordeaux
Rowers at the 2020 Summer Olympics
French male rowers
Olympic rowers of France